Menallen Township Sewer Authority is an agency that provides sewage treatment to populated areas of Menallen Township, Fayette County, Pennsylvania. There are approximately 1,200 customers on the system.

Service Areas 

Service is provided to those living in the following areas:

 New Salem-Buffington 
 Keisterville 
 Waltersburg
 Haddenville
 Dearth

The system also serves areas around US Route 40, State Route 21, and State Route 51.

Fees/Costs

Office Location 
Office location is in the Menallen Township Municipal Building, located at Searight's Crossroads.

Meetings 
Meetings are held monthly at the Menallen Township Municipal Building.

References

Government of Fayette County, Pennsylvania